Luis del Carmen Curiel (1846 - 1930) was a Mexican general during the Mexican Revolution who served as Governor of the Federal District from 19 February 1877 to 2 December 1880. 

He studied law at Yale University in New Haven, Connecticut. Curiel served as Governor of Jalisco twice until January 1903 and Governor of Yucatán from 11 March - 6 June 1911. He later served as a senator in the Senate of the Republic, XXVI legislature.  

He has been described as a "tactful military politician."

References 

1846 births
1930 deaths
Mexican generals
Mexican military personnel
Mexican military officers